Acacia storyi, commonly known as Story's wattle, is a species of Acacia of the subgenus Botrycephalae that is native to eastern Australia. It is listed as near threatened according to the Nature Conservation Act 1992 of Queensland.

Description
It blooms between April and August producing yellow flowers. The simple inflorescences are found in axillary racemes or in terminal false-panicles. The spherical flower-heads contain 14 to 20 cream to pale yellow coloured flowers. It forms seed pods between August and December. The coriaceous, dark red-brown or blue-black coloured pods are mostly straight-sided but can be slightly to deeply constricted between each of the seeds. It is closely related to both Acacia filicifolia and Acacia olsenii.

Taxonomy
The species was first formally identified by the botanist Mary Tindale in 1966 as part of the work New taxa of Acacia from Eastern Australia as published in the Proceedings of the Linnean Society of New South Wales. It was reclassified as Racosperma storyi by Leslie Pedley in 1987 then transferred back to genus Acacia in 2001. 
The type specimen was collected in 1961 by M.Lazarides and R.Story from around Rockland Spring to the south east of Blackwater. The specific epithet honour the collector of the type specimen.

Distribution
It is endemic to the Central Highlands Region of Queensland where it has a limited distribution along the Blackdown Tableland and lower plains along the western side of the tableland area. It is mostly situated on sandstone plateaux as a part of open forest communities often along with Acacia gittinsii and Acacia hendersonii. The bulk of the population is found within the National Park with three smaller populations found near Rockland Spring, along upper Davy Creek and to the north east of Woorabinda. Other associated species are Eucalyptus tereticornis, Eucalyptus cloeziana and various species of Aristida.

See also
 List of Acacia species

References

storyi
Fabales of Australia
Flora of Queensland
Plants described in 1966
Taxa named by Mary Tindale